Tiago Filipe Martins Gonçalves (born 3 September 1986) popularly known as Tiago Gonçalves is a Portuguese professional footballer playing for Lusitano as a defender.

Club career
Born in Viseu, Gonçalves spend 6 years at the academy of local club Académico Viseu before joining Braga youth academy in 2003. After 2 years, he was promoted to the B-team. He only made 2 appearances for the club before playing for clubs like Moreirense and Nelas  in the lower leagues. In 2008, he signed for  Académico Viseu.

Honours
Académico Viseu
Portuguese First Division (1): 2012–13

References

External links

1986 births
Living people
Association football defenders
People from Viseu
Portuguese footballers
S.C. Braga B players
Moreirense F.C. players
Académico de Viseu F.C. players
Segunda Divisão players
Liga Portugal 2 players
Sportspeople from Viseu District